Nesar-e Chalab Zard (also Romanized as Nesār-e Chālāb Zard and Neşār-e Chālāb Zard) is a village in Bijnavand Rural District, in the Zagros District of Chardavol County, Ilam Province, Iran. At the 2006 census, its population was 151, in 35 families. The village is populated by Kurds.

References 

Populated places in Chardavol County
Kurdish settlements in Ilam Province